Sediminitomix is a genus from the family of Flammeovirgaceae with one known species (Sediminitomix flava).

References

Further reading 
 

Sphingobacteriia
Bacteria genera
Monotypic bacteria genera